is a passenger railway station located in the city of Ōsakasayama, Osaka Prefecture, Japan, operated by the private railway operator Nankai Electric Railway. It has the station number "NK64".

Lines

Layout
The station consists of two ground-level opposed side platforms connected by an elevated station building.

Platforms

Adjacent stations

History
Sayama Station opened on January 30, 1898.

Passenger statistics
In fiscal 2019, the station was used by an average of 6,000 passengers daily.

Surrounding area
 Nankai Sayama Harmony Town
 Osaka Sayama City Kita Elementary School
 Osaka Hatsushiba Gakuen Kitanoda Campus

See also
 List of railway stations in Japan

References

External links

 Sayama Station from Nankai Electric Railway website  

Railway stations in Japan opened in 1898
Railway stations in Osaka Prefecture
 Ōsakasayama